Frederick Dutton may refer to:
 Frederick Dutton (Australian politician), pastoralist and politician in the colony of South Australia
 Frederick Dutton, 5th Baron Sherborne, British peer and clergyman
 Fred Dutton (Frederick Gary Dutton), American lawyer and Democratic Party power broker